David Maxwell Strang (born 13 December 1968 in Girvan) is a former Scottish middle-distance runner who won a gold medal at the 1994 European Indoor Championships in Paris and a silver medal at the 1993 World Indoor Championships in Toronto over 1500 m.

External links

1968 births
Living people
Scottish male middle-distance runners
Athletes (track and field) at the 1990 Commonwealth Games
Athletes (track and field) at the 1994 Commonwealth Games
Athletes (track and field) at the 1996 Summer Olympics
Olympic athletes of Great Britain
People from Girvan
Commonwealth Games medallists in athletics
Commonwealth Games silver medallists for Scotland
Sportspeople from South Ayrshire
Medallists at the 1990 Commonwealth Games